The 2014 Atlantic Coast Conference baseball tournament was held from May 20 through 25 at NewBridge Bank Park in Greensboro, North Carolina.  The annual tournament determines the conference champion of the Division I Atlantic Coast Conference for college baseball.   won their ninth tournament championship to earn the league's automatic bid to the 2014 NCAA Division I baseball tournament.  This is the last of 19 athletic championship events held by the conference in the 2013–14 academic year.  With the victory, Georgia Tech tied Clemson for the most tournament championships.

The tournament has been held every year but one since 1973, with Clemson and Georgia Tech now tied for the most championships, each winning nine.  Charter league members Duke and Maryland, along with recent entrants Virginia Tech and Boston College have never won the event.  Pittsburgh and Notre Dame played their first season in the ACC in 2014.

Format and seeding
The winner of each seven team division and the top eight other teams based on conference winning percentage, regardless of division, from the conference's regular season were seeded one through ten.  Seeds one and two were awarded to the two division winners.  The bottom four seeds played an opening round, with the winners advancing to pool play.  The winner of each pool played a single championship.

The NCAA approved the use of experimental instant replay rules during the event.  These rules are generally only in force during the College World Series, and allow umpires to use video to review fair/foul, home run, and spectator interference calls.

Schedule and results
All times shown are US EDT.

Pool Play

1 - Georgia Tech beat Clemson head-to-head
2 - Maryland beat Florida State head-to-head

Results

Play-In Round

Pool A

Pool B

Championship game

2014 All-ACC Tournament Team
Eleven players were named to the All-ACC Tournament team.

Most Valuable Player
Dusty Isaacs was named Tournament Most Valuable Player.  Isaacs was a pitcher for Georgia Tech.

References

Tournament
Atlantic Coast Conference baseball tournament
Atlantic Coast Conference baseball tournament
Atlantic Coast Conference baseball tournament
Baseball in North Carolina
College sports in North Carolina
History of Greensboro, North Carolina
Sports competitions in Greensboro, North Carolina